John Dane III (born July 15, 1950, in New Orleans, Louisiana) is an American Olympic sailor in the Star class. He competed in the 2008 Summer Olympics, where he finished 11th together with his son-in-law Austin Sperry. Dane almost made the Olympics in the dragon in 1968, when he took second place at the US Olympic trials in a borrowed boat. He also sailed the trials in the Soling (1972), Finn (1976) and Star (1984) classes.

Dane, together with Mark LeBlanc and John Cerise, was the winner of the first North American Championship Soling in Milwaukee back in 1969. This team also took the second place in the Soling World Championship of 1970 in Poole, UK.

He is the former president of Trinity Marine Group and the current president and CEO of Trinity Yachts, LLC.

References

1950 births
Living people
American male sailors (sport)
Finn class sailors
North American Champions Soling
Olympic sailors of the United States
Sailors at the 2008 Summer Olympics – Star
Star class sailors
2020 United States presidential electors
Mississippi Republicans